The cabinet of Dimitrie Brătianu ruled Romania from 10 April to 8 June 1881.

Ministers
The ministers of the cabinet were as follows:

President of the Council of Ministers:
Dimitrie Brătianu (10 April – 8 June, 1881)
Minister of the Interior: 
 Eugeniu Stătescu (10 April – 8 June, 1881)
Minister of Foreign Affairs: 
 Dimitrie Brătianu (10 April – 8 June, 1881)
Minister of Finance:
Col. Nicolae Dabija (10 April – 28 April 1881)
Dimitrie A. Sturdza (28 April – 8 June 1881)
Minister of Justice:
Mihail Pherekyde (10 April – 8 June, 1881)
Minister of War:
Gen. Gheorghe Slăniceanu (10 April – 8 June, 1881)
Minister of Religious Affairs and Public Instruction:
Vasile Alexandrescu Urechia (10 April – 8 June, 1881)
Minister of Public Works:
Col. Nicolae Dabija (10 April – 8 June, 1881)

References

Cabinets of Romania
Cabinets established in 1881
Cabinets disestablished in 1881
1881 establishments in Romania
1881 disestablishments in Romania